The common name digger wasp is a broad term which may refer to any member of the parasitoidal wasp families:

 Crabronidae, including Bembix sand wasps and Philanthus beewolves
 Sphecidae, including Ammophila sand wasps and mud daubers

Animal common name disambiguation pages